Christian Fittipaldi (born 18 January 1971) is a Brazilian former racing driver who has competed in various forms of motorsport including Formula One, Champ Car, and NASCAR.

Fittipaldi was fifth in the CART series in both 1996 and 2002, earning two wins and a second place in the 1995 Indianapolis 500. He has also had success racing sports prototypes, winning the 24 Hours of Daytona of 2004, 2014 and 2018, the 12 Hours of Sebring of 2015, the 6 Hours of Watkins Glen of 2013, 2016 and 2017, and has captured two IMSA SportsCar Championships with Action Express Racing during the 2014 and 2015 seasons.

He is the son of former Grand Prix driver and team owner Wilson Fittipaldi, and the nephew of two-time Formula One Champion and Indianapolis 500 winner Emerson Fittipaldi.

Early years

Fittipaldi was born in São Paulo. He is named after Christian Heins, a Brazilian racing driver who was killed in a wreck during the 1963 24 Hours of Le Mans. Fittipaldi was second in the Brazilian Formula Ford in 1988. After finishing third in the South American Formula 3 in 1989, in 1990 he won the title in  the Formula 3 Sudamericana and the fourth place in the British Formula 3.

In 1991, the Brazilian was installed in Europe to compete in the Formula 3000, where he captured two wins and seven podiums in ten races to obtain the championship against Alessandro Zanardi. Later, he was third in the Macau Grand Prix of Formula 3.

Formula One

His jump into Formula 1 happened in 1992 with Minardi, one of the most modest teams of the grid at the time; he scored a single point in 1992. Christian is the first Formula One driver to be born in the 1970s. Next year, he managed to score a total of five points in the Drivers' Championship, but the team decided to do away with him with two races to go in the season. The following season, he competed in the Footwork team and earned two fourth places, adding to a total of six points in the championship (as those finishes were his only points-paying results that year). At the end of the 1994 season Fittipaldi decided to try his luck in the racing competitions in the United States.

In 2016, in an academic paper that reported a mathematical modeling study that assessed the relative influence of driver and machine, Fittipaldi was ranked the 11th best Formula One driver of all time.

CART
Competing mainly in CART, Fittipaldi was a slow starter, noted for his consistency rather than his outright pace, although by the time he won his first CART event at Road America in 1999, he was a championship contender due to his consistent finishing, among which was a second place in the 1995 Indianapolis 500, which earned him Rookie of the Year honors in the race. However, just as Fittipaldi's American career looked to be taking off, he broke his leg for the first time (out of the two total he suffered while racing in CART) at the Surfer's Paradise race in 1997. Although he was able to return both times and win two races, he never won a CART championship.

NASCAR
With his Champ Car career on hold, Fittipaldi shifted his focus to NASCAR. He made three appearances in the Busch Series during the  2001 and 2002 seasons. Although he was not impressive in those races, he was signed to Petty Enterprises near late-2002 and made his Winston Cup debut at Phoenix after he caught the eye of Richard Petty. In 2003, he made his first (and only) Daytona 500 start in a one-race deal with Andy Petree and then made a handful of appearances for Petty in ARCA. In the summer of that year, Fittipaldi became the driver of the illustrious #43 car after John Andretti (cousin of Christian's former CART teammate Michael Andretti) was let go. He struggled and was reassigned shortly after the start of autumn, but remained with the team, driving the #44 car.

Sports cars racing
In parallel to his activity in Formula 1, was winner of the 1993 24 Hours of Spa and 1994 Brazilian 1000 Miles.

Fittipaldi debuted at the 24 Hours of Daytona in 2003 with the Bell team, resulting sixth with a Doran-Chevrolet of the class Daytona Prototype. It was one of the pilots that won the 2004 24 Hours of Daytona, in this case with a Doran-Pontiac. Then participated in four other rounds from the Grand-Am Rolex Sports Car Series with Bell, earning seventh in Virginia.

The Brazilian contested the first two races of the 2006 Grand-Am series with Bell, earning a sixth place at Homestead. Then ran six rounds with Riley-Pontiac of The Racer's Group, earning a victory in Phoenix, a second place in the 6 Hours of Watkins Glen and third in the 200 Miles at Watkins Glen.

In 2006, Fittipaldi disputed fully the Grand-Am series with the team of Eddie Cheever Jr. Obtained a second place and a sixth, to be located in the 23rd position in the drivers' championship of DP class. That same year, he participated in the 24 Hours of Le Mans with a Saleen S7, where he finished in sixth place in the GT1 class, a total of eleven participants.

Continuing with Cheever, Fittipaldi achieved a fourth, seventh and eighth in 2007 and resulting 20th in the overall table of the DP class of the Grand Am series. Also, it came tenth in the GT1 class of the 24 Hours of Le Mans, at the wheel of an Aston Martin DB9 of team Modena alongside Antonio Garcia and amateur.

Fittipaldi disputed the first four rounds of the 2008 American Le Mans Series with Andretti Green. Piloting an Acura LMP2 with Bryan Herta, earned a fourth place, a fifth, a sixth and a seventh. Then again disputed the 24 Hours of Le Mans with Aston Martin DB9 of Modena, reaching delayed in the 30th overall position. He then ran in the final five rounds of the Grand-Am series with a Coyote-Pontiac of Cheever's team, earning a second place and a sixth.

The driver was invited to run the 2011 24 Hours of Daytona with a Porsche-Riley of Action Express Racing, resulting third overall with Max Papis and João Barbosa among others. In 2012 he participated again in this race with Action Express, in this case at the wheel of a Chevrolet Corvette DP, with which finished fifth.

The Brazilian became in regular driver of Action Express for the 2013 Rolex Sports Car Series season. He achieved two wins at Mid-Ohio and the 6 Hours of Watkins Glen, two seconds places, a fourth and a fifth, mostly with Barbosa. Thus, he was seventh in the drivers' championship in the Daytona Prototypes class.

He won the Rolex 24 at Daytona in 2014  in the Action Express Corvette DP with João Barbosa and Sébastien Bourdais.

Racing career

Complete International Formula 3000 results
(key) (Races in bold indicate pole position) (Races
in italics indicate fastest lap)

Complete Formula One results
(key) (Races in bold indicate pole position)

Complete CART results
(key)

Complete A1 Grand Prix results
(key) (Races in bold indicate pole position) (Races in italics indicate fastest lap)

Complete Stock Car Brasil results
(key) (Races in bold indicate pole position) (Races in italics indicate fastest lap)

24 Hours of Daytona results

24 Hours of Le Mans results

Complete American Le Mans Series results

WeatherTech SportsCar Championship results
(key)(Races in bold indicate pole position, Results are overall/class)

NASCAR
(key) (Bold – Pole position awarded by qualifying time. Italics – Pole position earned by points standings or practice time. * – Most laps led.)

Winston Cup Series

Daytona 500

Busch Series

ARCA Re/Max Series
(key) (Bold – Pole position awarded by qualifying time. Italics – Pole position earned by points standings or practice time. * – Most laps led.)

References

External links

 
 

Living people
1971 births
Racing drivers from São Paulo
Brazilian racing drivers
Brazilian Formula One drivers
24 Hours of Daytona drivers
12 Hours of Sebring drivers
24 Hours of Le Mans drivers
24 Hours of Spa drivers
Indianapolis 500 drivers
Indianapolis 500 Rookies of the Year
Brazilian Champ Car drivers
International Formula 3000 drivers
International Formula 3000 Champions
Formula 3 Sudamericana drivers
A1 Team Brazil drivers
Brazilian IndyCar Series drivers
European Le Mans Series drivers
American Le Mans Series drivers
Rolex Sports Car Series drivers
Brazilian NASCAR drivers
ARCA Menards Series drivers
Stock Car Brasil drivers
TC 2000 Championship drivers
Brazilian expatriate sportspeople in the United States
Brazilian people of Italian descent
Brazilian people of Polish descent
Brazilian people of Russian descent
Minardi Formula One drivers
Arrows Formula One drivers
Superstars Series drivers
Brazilian WeatherTech SportsCar Championship drivers
Brazilian Formula Three Championship drivers
Christian Fittipaldi
Mercedes-AMG Motorsport drivers
Newman/Haas Racing drivers
A1 Grand Prix drivers
Action Express Racing drivers
Cheever Racing drivers
Andretti Autosport drivers
Walker Racing drivers
ART Grand Prix drivers